Hillcrest Wildlife Management Area is located in Hancock County near New Cumberland, West Virginia.

Follow Middle Run Road north to the Hillcrest WMA.

Hunting 

Hunting opportunities are varied in the Hillcrest WMA, and can include deer, mourning dove, grouse, rabbit, pheasant, squirrel, and turkey.

Camping is not permitted in the WMA.

See also

Animal conservation
Fishing
Hunting
List of West Virginia wildlife management areas

References

External links
 West Virginia DNR District 1 Wildlife Management Areas
West Virginia Hunting Regulations
West Virginia Fishing Regulations
WVDNR map of Hillcrest Wildlife Management Area

Wildlife management areas of West Virginia
Protected areas of Hancock County, West Virginia
IUCN Category V